Carlos Arturo Marulanda Ramirez (born November 25, 1945) is Colombian politician and diplomat. Marulanda served as Minister of Economic Development from 1988 to 1990 under the Presidency of Virgilio Barco Vargas. Shortly after, he became Ambassador to Belgium, the European Union and non-resident ambassador to Luxemburg.

In 2002, he was extradited back to Colombia by the Spanish government to answer charges relating to Right-wing paramilitarism in Colombia.

References

Additional sources
 

Ambassadors of Colombia to the European Union
Living people
1945 births
Colombian Ministers of Economic Development
Harvard University alumni
Ambassadors of Colombia to Belgium
Ambassadors of Colombia to Luxembourg
Alumni of the University of Cambridge